{{Infobox election
| election_name      = 2013 New York City comptroller election
| country            = New York City
| type               = Presidential
| previous_election  = 2009 New York City Comptroller election
| previous_year      = 2009
| next_election      = 2017 New York City Comptroller election
| next_year          = 2017
| election_date      = November 5, 2013
| image1             = 
| candidate1         = Scott Stringer
| party1             = Democratic Party (United States)
| alliance1          = Working Families Party
| popular_vote1      = 827,562
| percentage1        = 80.4%
| image2             = 
| candidate2         = John Burnett
| party2             = Republican Party (United States)
| alliance2          = Conservative; School Choice
| popular_vote2      = 171,635
| percentage2        = 16.7%
| map_image = NYC comptroller election results by borough 2013.svg
| map_size = 250px
| map_caption = Borough resultsStringer':    
| title              = Comptroller
| before_election    = John Liu
| before_party       = Democratic Party (United States)
| after_election     =Scott Stringer
| after_party        = Democratic Party (United States)
}}

The 2013 election for New York City Comptroller was held on November 5, 2013, along with elections for Mayor, Public Advocate, Borough Presidents, and members of the New York City Council.

The first-term incumbent Comptroller, John Liu, did not run for re-election, as he decided to run in the 2013 election for Mayor of New York City. The Democratic Party nomination was won by Scott Stringer, who defeated former Governor Eliot Spitzer, who resigned in disgrace in 2008. John Burnett was the Republican nominee.

On Election Day, Stringer handily defeated Burnett and various third-party candidates, winning 80.4% of the vote.

Democratic primary
New York City borough President Scott Stringer was considered to be the front runner for the Democratic nomination, having raised nearly $3.5 million as of July 7, 2013. When former New York governor Eliot Spitzer announced his intention to run for the office, he brought a larger challenge to Stringer. In 2008, while governor, Spitzer resigned amid a prostitution scandal. His name recognition as a former governor was expected to help him in the election, while the scandal was expected to harm his chances. "I'm hopeful there will be forgiveness, I am asking for it," Spitzer said, commenting on the scandal. "Politics is a contact sport," Spitzer said on July 8, on radio's The Bill Press Show. "I made significant errors. I stood up, accepted responsibility, resigned. It's now been five years, I hope the public will extend its forgiveness to me."

Coincidentally, Spitzer was running against Kristin M. Davis (who was running as a Libertarian), his former madam who had helped him get call girls as governor. She spent three months in prison for running an escort service. "This is going to be the funnest campaign ever," she told The New York Daily News. "I’ve been waiting for my day to face [Spitzer] for five years," Davis said. "I sat ... in Rikers Island, I came out penniless and nothing happened to him. The hypocrisy there is huge."

Stringer's campaign immediately responded to Spitzer's candidacy. On July 8, his campaign manager released a statement saying, "Scott Stringer has a proven record of results and integrity and entered this race to help New York's middle class regain its footing. By contrast, Eliot Spitzer is going to spurn the campaign finance program to try and buy personal redemption with his family fortune. The voters will decide." The statement alluded to Spitzer's family fortune. Prior to Spitzer's announcement, Stringer had already received several endorsements from candidates in the mayoral election, most of whom did not withdraw their endorsements after Spitzer's announcement. One of the first to publicly state her support of Stringer was Christine Quinn, who is the Speaker of the New York City Council. She stated, "Scott Stringer has been an exceptional borough president with the highest ethical standards. He has my full support and I will do whatever I can to help him become the next comptroller of the City of New York."

Spitzer appeared on CNBC's Morning Joe on July 9, and was visibly emotional when asked about what he had learned the past five years.

Stringer's fundraising soared dramatically after Spitzer's announcement. During the week of July 8, Stringer raised over $100,000. In all, Stringer had spent just over $679,000 and had $3 million on hand. Spitzer declared that he could use his family fortune to finance his campaign. Although he hired staffers to collect petitions, Spitzer's campaign did not list any major spending during the then most recent filing period.

On July 11, a deadline passed for candidates to file an ethics report. Several of the candidates, most notably Spitzer, did not file the report in time. Not filing a report can lead to a fine of between $250 and $10,000. However, there was a 1-week grace period before any penalties were enforced. A lawyer representing Spitzer's campaign said the candidate was "very busy" last week working on filing petitions with the signatures he needed to secure a spot on the Democratic ballot. A spokesperson for Stringer's campaign stated, "The old Eliot Spitzer supported stringent ethics disclosure. Just as we've seen on his decision to abandon campaign spending limits he once supported, it's increasingly clear that Eliot Spitzer believes there are two standards in public life—one for him, and one for everyone else." Even with that news, Spitzer was still leading in polls conducted.

In an ad that began airing during the week of July 22, 2013, Spitzer admitted that he "failed-big time." He went on to say, "I hurt a lot of people. When you dig yourself a hole, you can either lie in it the rest of your life, or do something positive. That's why I'm running... Everyone, no matter who you are, deserves a fair shot. I'm asking voters to give the same for me."

News coverage about the election (and, more specifically, Spitzer's attempt at redemption) were mixed. On July 18 CNN host Jake Tapper talked about Spitzer's "incredibly reckless and ... very illegal" prostitution scandal. In an interview on The Colbert Report, comedian Stephen Colbert noted Spitzer's lead in the polls by asking, "Do you [Spitzer] think that signals progress for our country or the slow decay of our moral values?" After Spitzer began laughing, Colbert declared, "This isn't Charlie Rose motherf**ker!" Speaking about Spitzer's own qualifications Colbert asked if Spitzer was "at once and the same time above and below this job?" He later asked, "Shouldn't the job of comptroller go to someone who has shown a modicum of self-comptrol? Why should the people trust you?" "The totality of a record," Spitzer suggested, such as his time as Attorney General, make him a suitable candidate. In 2010, after the initial scandal, Colbert told him he could be honest with him because Spitzer had "no public image to uphold." However, Politico blogger Gary Bauer suggested that, unlike Anthony Weiner (who was running for mayor), Spitzer seemed to be redeeming himself. Similarly, the Los Angeles Times noted that, while Spitzer's past had hurt him, voters were beginning to forgive him, noting that, unlike Weiner, Spitzer stopped his behavior immediately after leaving office.

Stringer defeated Spitzer in the primary election, 52.1%-47.9%.

Candidates

Declared
 Eliot Spitzer, former Governor of New York
 Scott Stringer, Manhattan Borough President

Withdrew
 Daniel Garodnick, New York City Councilman

Declined
 John Liu, incumbent Comptroller (running for Mayor)
 Domenic Recchia, New York City Councilman (running for Congress)
 Anthony Weiner, former U.S. Representative (running for Mayor)
 David Yassky, Chairman of the New York City Taxi and Limousine Commission and candidate for Comptroller in 2009

Polling

Results

Republican primary
John Burnett, a Wall Street financier, ran unopposed for the nomination of the Republican Party. In mid-July 2013, he announced he would release his personal tax returns. New York Republican consultant William F. B. O'Reilly opined that Burnett would have a reasonably strong chance of success in the election if Spitzer won the Democratic primary.

Candidates

 Nominee 
 John Burnett, financier

Major third parties
Besides the Democratic and Republican parties, the Conservative, Green, Independence and Working Families parties are qualified New York parties. These parties have automatic ballot access.

Conservative

Nominee
 John Burnett, financier

Green

Nominee
 Julia Willebrand, activist, candidate for Mayor in 2001 and candidate for New York State Comptroller in 2006

Working Families

Nominee
 Scott Stringer, Manhattan Borough President

Minor third parties
Any candidate not among the six qualified New York parties (Democratic, Republican, Conservative, Green, Independence and Working Families) must petition their way onto the ballot; they do not face primary elections.

Libertarian

Nominee
 Hesham El-Meligy, activist

Withdrew
 Kristin M. Davis, former Madam with ties to Eliot Spitzer's prostitution scandal and Anti-Prohibition Party nominee for Governor in 2010

Socialist Worker

Nominee
 John W. Studer

School Choice

Nominee
 John L. Burnett

War Veterans Party

Nominee
 Richard Bozulich, publisher

Results
On Election Day, Stringer handily defeated Burnett and various third-party candidates, winning 80.4% of the vote. Burnett received 16.7% of the vote.

See also

New York City Comptroller
Government of New York City
2013 New York City mayoral election
2013 New York City Public Advocate election

References

Further reading 
Paterson, David "Black, Blind, & In Charge: A Story of Visionary Leadership and Overcoming Adversity."'' New York, New York, 2020

External links
 Scott Stringer for NYC Comptroller
 John Burnett for NYC Comptroller
 Hesham El-Meligy for NYC Comptroller
 Julia Willebrand for NYC Comptroller

New York City Comptroller
Election Comptroller
Comptroller 2013